Dieckmann is a surname, and may refer to;

 August Dieckmann (1912-1943), German colonel
 Bärbel Dieckmann (1949- ), German politician
 Carolina Dieckmann (1978- ), Brazilian actress
 Christina Dieckmann (1977- ), Venezuelan actress
 Christoph Dieckmann (beach volleyball) (1976- ), German beach volleyball player
 Ed Dieckmann, Netherlands musician
 Johannes Dieckmann (1893-1969), East German politician 
 Katherine Dieckmann, American film director
 Markus Dieckmann (1976- ), German beach volleyball player
 Walter Dieckmann (1869-1925), German chemist